The General American Marks Company is a part of GATX Corporation, formerly the General American Transportation Company. Which has headquarters in Chicago, GATX Corporation owns businesses that lease railcars, locomotives, and aircraft.

Some past and present locomotive and railcar reporting marks for GATX companies, including General American Marks Company and GATX Rail, are GABX, GACX, GATX, GSCX and GCCX.

References
 GATX Corporation's Web site: "GATX provides lease financing and related services to customers operating rail, air, marine and other targeted assets."
 Railinc Corporation: Reporting Marks: "All privately owned railcars end in X (for example, General American Marks Company, mark GATX)."

Transportation companies of the United States
Companies based in Chicago
Transportation companies based in Illinois